Panagiotis Lafazanis (born 19 November 1951) is a Greek Russophile politician. He served as the leader of a new Greek left-wing political party, Popular Unity, from 21 August 2015 until his resignation on 2 June 2019.

Previously he was a member of Syriza, and from 27 January to 17 July 2015 he served in the cabinet of Alexis Tsipras as the Minister of Productive Reconstruction, Environment and Energy.

Early life and education
Born in Elefsina, Lafazanis attended the faculty of mathematics at the University of Athens but did not graduate.

Political career
Lafazanis was involved in the Communist Party of Greece until the 1992 formation of Synaspismos, where he served as a member of the Political Secretariat.

Lafazanis was first elected as a Member of the Hellenic Parliament for Piraeus B at the 2000 Greek legislative election, representing Synaspismos. He was re-elected at the 2004 legislative election, the 2009 election (this time representing Syriza), the May 2012 election, the June 2012 election and the January 2015 election.

In the parliament of 2012–2014, he was Syriza's Parliamentary Spokesman and a member of the Special Permanent Committee on Institutions and Transparency. After the 2015 legislative election, he was appointed Minister of Productive Reconstruction, Environment and Energy in the cabinet of Alexis Tsipras on 27 January.

Lafazanis was the leader of Syriza's Left Platform and has been involved in a number of disputes with the more moderate party leader Alexis Tsipras. He has called "for SYRIZA to [be] swept by a new wave of radicalization in all areas, ideological, political, programmatic", opposing "the Troika, memoranda, neoliberalism and finally capitalism itself", and has spoken against continued Greek membership of the euro, describing the European Union as "totalitarian". On 11 July 2015, he rebelled against the SYRIZA/ANEL coalition by abstaining on a vote for austerity measures for a new bailout within the Eurozone.

In a cabinet reshuffle on 17 July 2015, Lafazanis was removed from his role as the Minister of Productive Reconstruction, Environment and Energy. He was replaced by Panos Skourletis, the Minister of Labour and Social Solidarity.
In 2022 he posted an election poster with the slogan “Russia is right, the United States and NATO have created hell in Ukraine.” The poster was decorated with the military symbol "Z" In January 2023, he founded a new Russophile party with the name Democratic Movement of National Liberation.

Personal life

Lafazanis is married to Fryni Dialeti and has three daughters. He also speaks English fluently.

References

External links
 

1951 births
Coalition of Left, of Movements and Ecology politicians
Greek MPs 2009–2012
Greek MPs 2012 (May)
Greek MPs 2012–2014
Greek MPs 2015 (February–August)
Greek anti-capitalists
Greek Marxists
Living people
National and Kapodistrian University of Athens alumni
Syriza politicians
Environment ministers of Greece
People from Elefsina